Clifton is a Census-designated place located in Spartanburg County in the U.S. State of South Carolina. According to the 2010 United States Census, the population was 541.

Geography
Clifton is located at  (34.986051, -81.820395). These coordinates place the CDP on the East side of the county, between the cities of Spartanburg and Cowpens.

According to the United States Census Bureau, the CDP has a total land area of 1.073  square miles (2.946  km) and a total water area of 0.065  square mile (0.168  km).

Demographics

References

Census-designated places in Spartanburg County, South Carolina
Census-designated places in South Carolina